Night of Mystery may refer to:
 Night of Mystery (1937 film), an American mystery film
 Night of Mystery (1927 film), a German silent thriller film